Freightera Logistics Inc. is a Vancouver-based business to business (B2B) online freight marketplace that allows businesses to get road or rail transport quotes from North American carriers, and make direct shipment bookings.

History 
The company was founded by its CEO Eric Beckwitt (a former GIS analyst) and his wife, Zhenya Beck in May 2014.

The company began operations by connecting freight trucks with businesses across Canadian routes but later grew to include rail services and lower energy emission carriers certified by the joint USA/Canada environment-friendly SmartWay program.

, the company serves 9,000 business and 800 carriers across 16 billion North American routes.

Funding 
In 2016, the company raised C$2.1 million in funding via Robson Capital and angel investors in California. In 2018 the company received another undisclosed seven-figure investment from Silicon Valley-based Decathlon Capital Partners.

References 

Companies based in Vancouver
2014 establishments in British Columbia
Logistics companies of Canada